Albertus John Rooks (1869-1958) was the Principal of Calvin College from 1900 to 1918.

References

External links 

 Calvin College biography

1869 births
1958 deaths
Presidents of Calvin University
People from Holland, Michigan